Wolaita Liqa School is school in Ethiopia based in Wolaita Sodo. The school is a recognized community model school among the community. Wolaita Liqa School was established by the Wolaita Development Association in Sodo Town in 2000, funded by Japan's grant-in-aid for grassroots human security projects. After a while, the school was expanded to provide secondary education. Wolaita Liqa School is the leading school in the SNNPR with a prominent record in the national exam. The school has its own vision and mission, that is to produce talented and creative students and to advocate and spread the value of education among those who are deprived of it.

School facilities

The Teaching & Learning of the school is model in activity based learning (ABL) by employing ICT, Science Laboratories & STEM center. Wolaitta Liqa School also provides boarding service for both WODA beneficiary & Cost sharing students. The school has many students graduated from Domestic & International colleges & Universities organized in Alumni.

References 

Elementary and primary schools in Ethiopia
Wolayita